François Chau (born October 26, 1959) is a Cambodian American actor. He is known for his roles as Dr. Pierre Chang in ABC's Lost, Quick Kick on G.I. Joe: A Real American Hero, Dr. Chang in the film 21 & Over, The Shredder in Teenage Mutant Ninja Turtles II: The Secret of the Ooze, and in 2015-18, as industrialist Jules-Pierre Mao, a recurring character in Amazon's The Expanse.

Early life
Chau was born in Phnom Penh, Cambodia, of Chinese and Vietnamese descent. When he was roughly 6 years old, he and his family moved to Saigon (now Ho Chi Minh City). At the age of 7, Chau moved from Saigon to France due to the Vietnam War and after a year moved to Washington, D.C., United States. It was there that Chau and his family lived and where Chau was schooled.

After he graduated from college, Chau moved out to Los Angeles where he has remained since and now lives with his wife and daughter.

Career
Chau has had a number of diverse roles, playing Chinese, Japanese and even Hmong characters, most notably as Dr. Martin Ng in the American sci-fi series Gemini Division, and as Dr. Pierre Chang in 17 episodes of ABC's Lost.

Chau has also taken on a number of smaller TV roles. He has appeared as Koo Yin, a Chinese consul in the drama 24 and a Chinese diplomat in  Stargate SG-1. He was the voice of Quick Kick on G.I. Joe: A Real American Hero and Dr. Shen in XCOM: Enemy Unknown, and he portrayed Lieutenant Winston 'Vagabond' Chang in the Wing Commander III and Wing Commander IV video games. He was the voice of Sensei Ishikawa in the Ghost of Tsushima video game.

Chau has appeared as a guest star in The Adventures of Brisco County, Jr., The Unit, NUMB3RS, ER, Baywatch, Alias, Shark, Criminal Minds, Grey's Anatomy, JAG, Medium, The X-Files, Last Man Standing, and NCIS.

He was also featured in Chris Brown's music video Fine China, the 2013 film 21 & Over, the television film 9/11: The Twin Towers, and Teenage Mutant Ninja Turtles II: The Secret of the Ooze, where he physically played The Shredder.

His latest projects have included a Syfy production, The Expanse, starring as recurring character Jules-Pierre Mao, father of main character Julie Mao, and a recurring role as Arthur's step-father Walter on The Tick. He has also appeared in the Disney Channel spy-action comedy, K.C. Undercover, where he plays Zane, an evil villain who kidnaps K.C. and threatens to kill her family, due to a checkered history with them.

Chau portrayed mob-boss Mr. Keo in Cathy Yan's live action DC adaptation of Birds of Prey, starring Margot Robbie.

Chau appeared on The George Lucas Talk Show during a fundraiser where various guests appeared for a marathon of the entirety of the seventh season of the HBO series Arli$$. In 2019 he starred in the science fiction horror film The Honeymoon Phase.

Personal life
Chau is married and has a daughter.

Filmography

Film

Television

Video games

Awards and nominations 
2011 Ovation Awards: Nominated for Featured Actor in a Play for the role of Dr. Heng in the Geffen Playhouse production of "Extraordinary Chambers"

References

External links
 
 
 AArisings A-Profiler Interview Published November 18, 2007

1959 births
Living people
Cambodian emigrants to the United States
American male film actors
American male television actors
American male voice actors
Cambodian people of Vietnamese descent
Cambodian people of Chinese descent
People from Phnom Penh
20th-century American male actors
21st-century American male actors
American male actors of Chinese descent
American people of Vietnamese descent